Surat thani United Football Club (Thai สโมสรฟุตบอลสุราษฎร์ธานี ยูไนเต็ด), is a Thai football club based in Surat Thani, Thailand. The club get currently champion in the 2016 Football Division 3 of Southern Region and was promoted to Thai League 4 Southern Region. Although The club don't pass Club-Liciencing of T4, The club was automatically relegated to 2017 Thailand Amateur League Southern Region again. The club was formed in 2016 and entered the Thai Football Division 3 in same years.

Stadium and locations

Season By Season Record

Honours

Domestic Leagues
 Football Division 3
 Winners (1): 2016

References

Association football clubs established in 2016
Football clubs in Thailand
Sport in Loei province
2016 establishments in Thailand